Gopal Prasad Sinha is an Indian neurologist, politician and a member of the Institutional Ethical Committee of the Indian Council of Medical Research. He was born and brought up in Patna, in the Indian state of Bihar and is an alumnus of Patna University. He unsuccessfully contested in 2014 Indian Parliament elections from the Patna Sahib constituency under the Janata Dal (United) candidacy, against the incumbent Member of Parliament, Shatrughan Sinha.

Sinha was married to late Indira Sinha, an educationist, and has a daughter, Jaya Sinha Kumra, and a son, Ajay Alok, who is a known politician from Bihar. He is a 2004 recipient of the fourth highest Indian civilian award, Padma Shri for his services to the field of medicine.

References

Recipients of the Padma Shri in medicine
Scientists from Patna
Indian neurologists
Patna University alumni
20th-century Indian medical doctors
Janata Dal (United) politicians
Politicians from Patna
Medical doctors from Bihar
Candidates in the 2014 Indian general election
Year of birth missing (living people)
Living people